Nudgee Beach is a suburb and beach in the City of Brisbane, Queensland, Australia.

Geography 

The suburb is bounded to the north-east by Moreton Bay, to the south-west by Kedron Brook, to the south-west by the Gateway Motorway, and to the north-west by Nundah Creek. Directly to the south is Brisbane Airport.

There is a small residential area in the east of the suburb near the beach.

There is a Brisbane City Council waste transfer station (known by the council as a resource recovery centre) in the south of the locality. The remainder of the locality is mangrove wetlands with the northern part of the suburb being part of the Boondall Wetlands.

There is a network of bike tracks which connect through to  Toombul shopping centre.

History 

The name Nudgee comes from the Yuggera word in the Yugarabul dialect, nardha meaning place of ducks, from nar meaning duck and dha meaning place.Nudgee Beach Provisional School opened on 1 April 1926. In 1946 it became Nudgee Beach State School. It closed on 25 March 1988. In 1989 the school reopened as Nudgee Beach Field Study Centre. In 1992 it was renamed Nudgee Beach Environmental Education Centre.

At the  Nudgee Beach  had a population of 261 people. The median age of the Nudgee Beach population was 45 years of age, 8 years above the Australian median. Children aged under 15 years made up 13.8% of the population and people aged 65 years and over made up 17.7% of the population. 77.9% of people living in Nudgee Beach were born in Australia, compared to the national average of 69.8%; the next most common countries of birth were England 4.6%, New Zealand 4.2%, Ireland 2.7%, Germany 1.1%, Papua New Guinea 1.1%. 88.8% of people spoke only English at home; the next most popular languages were 1.9% German, 1.9% Vietnamese, 1.5% Thai, 1.2% Pacific Austronesian Languages. The median weekly household income in Nudgee Beach was $1,224, very similar to the national median of $1,234. Nearly all households in Nudgee Beach (97.0%) were separate houses, there were no semi-detached, row or terrace houses, townhouses etc., and no flats, units or apartments, and 3.0% were classified as "other dwellings". The average household size was 2.5 people.

Education 

Nudgee Beach Environmental Education Centre is an Outdoor and Environmental Education Centre at 1588 Nudgee Road.

There are no schools in Nudgee Beach. The nearest primary and secondary school is Earnshaw State College in Banyo.

Amenities 
There is a boat ramp and floating walkway at Nudgee Beach Road providing access to Kedron Brook.

There are four canoe ramps:

 from Fortitude Street into Moreton Bay
from O'Quinn Street into Nudgee Creek
from Mangrove boardwalk into Nudgee Creek
from Boondal Wetlands into Nundah Creek

References

External links

 
 
 

Suburbs of the City of Brisbane
Beaches of Queensland